Force of Evil is a 1948 American crime film noir starring John Garfield and directed by Abraham Polonsky. It was adapted by  Polonsky and Ira Wolfert from Wolfert's novel Tucker's People. Polonsky had been a screenwriter for the boxing film Body and Soul (1947), in which Garfield had also played the male lead.

In 1994, Force of Evil was selected for preservation in the United States National Film Registry by the Library of Congress as being "culturally, historically, or aesthetically significant".

Plot

Lawyer Joe Morse (Garfield) works for a powerful gangster, Tucker, who wishes to consolidate and control the numbers racket in New York City. This requires absorbing  many smaller outfits, one of which is run by Morse's older brother Leo (Thomas Gomez). One relishes his life in the underworld, the other is disgusted by it and seeks to minimize its impact.  Even seeking to soften things for Leo things go wrong for Joe, and tragedy befalls both.

The terse, melodramatic thriller incorporates realist location photography, almost poetic dialogue and biblical allusions to Cain and Abel and Judas's betrayal.

Cast
 John Garfield as Joe Morse
 Beatrice Pearson as Doris Lowry
 Thomas Gomez as Leo Morse
 Marie Windsor as Edna Tucker
 Howland Chamberlain as Frederick "Freddie" Bauer
 Roy Roberts as Ben Tucker
 Paul Fix as Bill Ficco
 Stanley Prager as Wally
 Barry Kelley as Det. Egan
 Beau Bridges as Frankie Tucker

Reception

Critical response
When the film was released, the staff at Variety magazine gave the film a mixed review, praising its production values but panning its focus and "intrusively" flowery language:

Bosley Crowther, the film critic for The New York Times, liked the film, and wrote, "But for all its unpleasant nature, it must be said that this film is a dynamic crime-and-punishment drama, brilliantly and broadly realized. Out of material and ideas that have been worked over time after time, so that they've long since become stale and hackneyed, it gathers suspense and dread, a genuine feeling of the bleakness of crime and a terrible sense of doom. And it catches in eloquent tatters of on-the-wing dialogue moving intimations of the pathos of hopeful lives gone wrong."

Wrote film historian Andrew Sarris in 1968, "Force of Evil stands up under repeated viewings as one of the great films of the modern American cinema and Garfield's taxicab scene with Beatrice Pearson takes away some of the luster Kazan's Brando-Steiger tour de force in On the Waterfront."

In the decades since its release Force of Evil has been recognized by some as a high point of the film noir genre, powerful in its poetic images and language, by such film critics and historians such as William S. Pechter and Andrew Dickos. Its influence has been acknowledged many times by Martin Scorsese in the making of his crime dramas.

Box-office
According to MGM records the film earned $948,000 in the US and $217,000 overseas.

Accolades
American Film Institute Lists
 AFI's 100 Years ... 100 Movies - Nominated
 AFI's 10 Top 10 - Nominated Gangster Film
 AFI's 100 Years ... 100 Movies (10th Anniversary Edition) - Nominated

References

External links

 
 
 
 
 
 
 Force of Evil analysis of film by Sydney Pollack at Turner Classic Movies
 
 Force of Evil essay by Daniel Eagan in America's Film Legacy: The Authoritative Guide to the Landmark Movies in the National Film Registry, A&C Black, 2010 , pages 421-423 

1948 films
1948 crime drama films
American crime drama films
American black-and-white films
1940s English-language films
Film noir
Films set in New York City
Films about gambling
Metro-Goldwyn-Mayer films
United States National Film Registry films
Films shot in Fort Lee, New Jersey
Films shot in New York City
Films scored by David Raksin
1940s American films